Nikolayevka is a rural locality (a selo) in Tambovskoye Rural Settlement, Ternovsky District, Voronezh Oblast, Russia. The population was 322 as of 2010. There are 5 streets.

References 

Rural localities in Ternovsky District